Sopot Ice Piedmont is an ice piedmont situated on Burgas Peninsula, Livingston Island in the South Shetland Islands, Antarctica, northeast of Iskar Glacier and north of Ropotamo, Strandzha and Pautalia Glaciers. It extends 7.5 km in east–west direction and 2.4 km in south–north direction, drains the northern slopes of Delchev Ridge east of Delchev Peak and Ghiaurov Peak, and flows northward into Moon Bay between Rila Point to the west and Malyovitsa Crag near Renier Point to the east.

The glacier is named after the Bulgarian town of Sopot.

Location
Bulgarian mapping in 2005 and 2009.

See also
 List of glaciers in the Antarctic
 Glaciology

Maps
 L.L. Ivanov et al. Antarctica: Livingston Island and Greenwich Island, South Shetland Islands. Scale 1:100000 topographic map. Sofia: Antarctic Place-names Commission of Bulgaria, 2005.
 L.L. Ivanov. Antarctica: Livingston Island and Greenwich, Robert, Snow and Smith Islands. Scale 1:120000 topographic map.  Troyan: Manfred Wörner Foundation, 2009.

References

External links
 Sopot Ice Piedmont. SCAR Composite Gazetteer of Antarctica
 Bulgarian Antarctic Gazetteer. Antarctic Place-names Commission. (details in Bulgarian, basic data in English)

External links
 Sopot Ice Piedmont. Copernix satellite image

Glaciers of Livingston Island